Padhe Padhe is a 2013 Indian romantic drama film directed by R. Nagaraj Peenya and starring Tarun Chandra, Akhila Kishore and Mridula Sathe.

Cast 
Tarun Chandra as Sunny 
Akhila Kishore as Kanchana 
Mridula Sathe as Spoorthi
Karthik Jayaram
Veena Sundar as Sunny's mother
Vijay Kashi as Sunny's father
Girija Lokesh

Soundtrack 
The music is composed by Satish Aryan.
"Manasaagideyo"

Reception 
A critic from The Times of India opined that "A good show by debutant director R Nagaraj Peenya who has selected a romantic story with a good script and freshness in narration. It’s a new experience to watch this neat love subject with a difference". A critic from Rediff.com said that "Although the movie cannot be viewed pade pade (again and again), it is a neat and decent entertainer".

Box office 
The film ran for fifty days.

References 

2010s Kannada-language films
Indian romantic drama films